Lock On: Modern Air Combat or LOMAC, known in Russia as Lock On, is a modern combat flight simulator developed by Eagle Dynamics and published by Ubi Soft in Europe and 1C Company in Russia; it is considered as a survey simulator by its creators. It is a continuation of the Flanker series. It contains 8 flyable aircraft and over 40 non-playable/AI-controlled planes. The game mainly revolves around air-to-air combat and  air-to-ground combat with some optional, unique roles such as pinpoint/anti-radiation strikes, anti-ship strikes or aerobatics. The game realistically models all aspects of take-off and landing, AWACS (also known as AEW&C), carrier-based landings (for the Su-33), and aerial refueling.

Expansions

Flaming Cliffs 
LockOn: Flaming Cliffs is a continuation of LockOn: Modern Air Combat. It adds additional content including a playable Su-25T, new missions and updated textures. Three singleplayer campaigns titled Flaming Cliffs, Hot Wind and Last Ditch are included.

Flaming Cliffs 2 
LockOn: Flaming Cliffs 2 is a further evolution of LockOn: Flaming Cliffs. All of the player-controlled aircraft have been transferred to the virtual environment created for the Digital Combat Simulator series. It features a new GUI and mission editor. AI flight models, gun ballistics, 3D models and sound. Flaming Cliffs 2 is network-compatible with DCS: Black Shark.

Flaming Cliffs 3 
Flaming Cliffs 3 was released as a DCS World module, porting all flyable aircraft into the DCS World game client.

Reception
The editors of Computer Gaming World nominated Lock On: Modern Air Combat for their 2003 "Flight Simulation of the Year" award, which ultimately went to Flight Simulator 2004: A Century of Flight.

References

External links
 

2003 video games
1C Company games
Ubisoft games
Combat flight simulators
Windows games
Windows-only games
Video games developed in Russia
Video games with expansion packs
Lua (programming language)-scripted video games
Flight simulation video games